Sonbhadra railway station (station code: SBDR) is a railway station in Sonbhadra district, Uttar Pradesh, India, serving the town of Robertsganj. The station is connected to major cities such as Jammu, Amritsar, Delhi, Kanpur,, Prayagraj, Varanasi and Lucknow.

The station has two well sheltered platforms. It has many facilities including water and sanitation. Currently electrification work is being done along with survey to connect it to Varanasi Junction and Pandit Deen Dayal Upadhyay Junction to reduce rush from these stations.

Trains 
Some of the trains that runs from Sonbhadra are :

 Shaktinagar Terminal–Tanakpur Express
 Triveni Express
 Chunar–Barwadih Passenger
 Singrauli–Patna Link Express
 Varanasi–Singrauli Intercity Express
 Chopan–Allahabad Passenger 
 Santragachi–Ajmer Weekly Express
 Sambhalpur–Jammu Tawi Express
 Bareilly–Barwadih Triveni Link Express
 Ranchi–Chopan Express 
 Tatanagar–Jammu Tawi Express
 Jharkhand Swarna Jayanti Express

References

Railway stations in Sonbhadra district
Allahabad railway division